The National People's Congress Constitution and Law Committee is one of ten special committees of the National People's Congress, the national legislature of the People's Republic of China. The special committee was created during the first session of the 6th National People's Congress in June 1983, and has existed for every National People's Congress since.

The Committee is formerly known as the National People's Congress Law Committee. Since 2018, it was renamed as the National People's Congress Constitution and Law Committee.

Chairpersons

References 

Constitution and Law Committee